Ebenezer J. Shields was an American politician that represented Tennessee's tenth district in the United States House of Representatives.

Biography
Shields was born in Georgia on December 22, 1778. He moved to Tennessee in 1809 and settled on Robertson Fork Creek near Lynnville. He graduated from the University of Nashville, Tennessee in 1827. He studied law, was admitted to the bar, and practiced law in Pulaski, Tennessee.

Career
An elegant public speaker,  Shields was a member of the Tennessee House of Representatives between 1833 and 1835.

Shields was elected as a White supporter to the Twenty-fourth Congress by the tenth district of Tennessee and re-elected as a Whig. He was an unsuccessful candidate for re-election in 1838 to the Twenty-sixth Congress. He served from March 4, 1835 to March 3, 1839.  He resumed his profession in Pulaski and moved to Memphis, Tennessee in 1844, where he continued the practice of his profession. He was Presidential Elector for Tennessee, 1840.

Death
Shields died on April 21, 1846(age 67 years, 120 days near La Grange, Texas.
It is unknown where he is interred.

References

External links

1778 births
1846 deaths
People from Georgia (U.S. state)
National Republican Party members of the United States House of Representatives from Tennessee
Whig Party members of the United States House of Representatives from Tennessee
Members of the Tennessee House of Representatives
People from Pulaski, Tennessee